The Lithuanian Supercup or LFF Supercup is an annual football match contested between the champions of the previous A Lyga season and the holders of the Lithuanian Football Cup. It is organised by and named after Lithuanian Football Federation and played at the beginning of the season. For sponsorship reasons, it is currently also known as the LFF Optibet Supercup.

Until 2016, if the Lithuanian championship and the Cup was won by the same team, the match was not held and the Supercup was awarded automatically to the winning team. Since 2016 the format was changed and double winners then play the league runners-up.

The trophy has been contested since 1995 with four interruptions.

The current holders are Žalgiris Vilnius who defeated Kauno Žalgiris in the 2023 Lithuanian Supercup.

Sponsorship
Three companies signed title sponsorship agreements after the 2016 revisions of the competition regulations. The current tournament partner Enlabs AB replaced Betsson in 2020 and then extended contract for a further two years in 2022. Betsson had signed a four-year deal with the Lithuanian Football Federation shortly after the 2017 competition, but only remained as the name holder for a two-year stint.

Past winners

Performance by club
Clubs in italics are defunct.

References

External links
 The history of the Supercup on the Lithuanian Football Federation website 

 
Lithuania
2